Paharia language  may refer to:
 the Malto language of east-central India;
 the Mal Paharia language of east-central India;
 Nepali, the official language of Nepal;
 a dialect of Santali.

See also 
 Pahari language (disambiguation)